The 1947–48 Svenska mästerskapet was the 17th season of Svenska mästerskapet, a tournament held to determine the Swedish Champions of men's handball. The tournament was contested by all Allsvenskan teams and all District Champions, along with invited teams from Division II. 32 teams competed in the tournament. Redbergslids IK were the defending champions, but were defeated by IFK Kristianstad in the final. IFK Kristianstad won their second title. The semifinals and final were played on 20–21 March in Sporthallen in Kristianstad. The final was watched by 1,628 spectators.

Results

First Round 
 IFK Luleå–Sollefteå GIF 9–15
 Upsala Studenters IF–SoIK Hellas 9–10
 Umeå IK–IFK Sundsvall 14–8
 Norrköpings AIS–F 11 Nyköping 7–8
 Uddevalla IS–Skövde AIK 9–22
 Karlstads BIK–Majornas IK 11–10
 Norslunds IF–Sandvikens IF 8–18
 Halmstads HBP–Redbergslids IK 9–15
 Jönköpings BK–IFK Kristianstad 6–8
 Örebro SK–IFK Lidingö 11–6
 Hallstahammars SK–Västerås HF 9–12
 IFK Östersund–Gävle GIK 13–17
 IFK Malmö–IK Heim 11–12
 IFK Karlskrona–Ystads IF 13–8
 IK Göta–Västerås IK 6–12
 Visby IF–Spårvägens HF 11–15

Second Round 
 Sollefteå GIF–SoIK Hellas 7–18
 Umeå IK–F 11 Nyköping 6–14
 Skövde AIK–Karlstads BIK 5–8 
 Sandvikens IF–Redbergslids IK 4–13
 IFK Kristianstad–Örebro SK 12–9
 Västerås HF–Gävle GIK 14–7
 IK Heim–IFK Karlskrona 4–6
 Västerås IK–Spårvägens HF 13–7

Quarterfinals 
 SoIK Hellas–F 11 Nyköping 9–7
 Karlstads BIK–Redbergslids IK 5–10
 IFK Kristianstad–Västerås HF 10–5
 IFK Karlskrona–Västerås IK 5–6

Semifinals 
 SoIK Hellas–Redbergslids IK 3–14
 IFK Kristianstad–Västerås IK 12–10

Match for third place 
 Västerås IK–SoIK Hellas 9–6

Final 
 IFK Kristianstad–Redbergslids IK 8–7 a.e.t.

Champions 
The following players for IFK Kristianstad received a winner's medal: Bertil Andersson, Göte Pålsson, Carl-Erik Stockenberg (2 goals in the final), Bertil Rönndahl, Evert Sjunnesson, Erik Nordström (2), Åke Moberg (3), Göte Saloonen, Axel Nissen and Åke Skough (1).

See also
1947–48 Allsvenskan (men's handball)

References 

Swedish handball competitions